Ministry: International Journal for Pastors is an international monthly magazine for Christian ministers, with a circulation of approximately 78,000. It is published by the Ministerial Association (website), an official body of the worldwide Adventist church. It is aimed at pastors and ministers of the Seventh-day Adventist Church, and also those of other denominations. It has a monthly circulation of roughly 18,000 to Adventist church leaders, and a bi-monthly circulation of roughly 60,000 to clergy from other denominations on a complimentary basis. As of 2011 it was edited by Derek Morris. The current editor is Pavel Goia. Its ISSN is 0026-5314.

History

Ministry was first published in 1928 and is now available in English, Spanish, Portuguese, Russian, Korean, Chinese, Japanese and Indonesian languages. The original headquarters was in Washington DC. On April 6, 2009 a French edition of Ministry magazine was launched.

Editors
The current editor is Pavel Goia. Previously, the editorial team was led by Derek Morris.

 – Present: Pavel Goia
 1928–1950: Le Roy Froom

Awards
Associated Church Press (ACP)
Award of Excellence Magazine Cover category for New Testament House Churches, 2008
Award of Excellence Magazine Cover category for Preaching Through a Storm, April 2009
Honorable Mention Interview category for “Prayer-saturated preaching” by Derek Morris, July 2009
Award of Excellence Theological: Biblical Interpretation category for Gerald A. Klingbeil, 2010
Award of Merit Reporting and Writing category for David E. Thomas, 2010
Honorable Mention Magazine Cover category, 2010
Award of Excellence Theological: Biblical Interpretation category for Kim Papaioannou, 2012

See also

 Adventist Review

 General Conference of Seventh-day Adventists

References

External links
 Ministry official website
 Archives from the magazine website, and archives from AdventistArchives.org
 "“A Third Rate Lot”: A Brief History of the SDA Ministry" by Jeff Crocombe, April 1, 2008

Magazines established in 1928
Magazines published in Maryland
Magazines published in Washington, D.C.
Multilingual magazines
Monthly magazines published in the United States
Seventh-day Adventist magazines published in the United States